Cecily Stella Wedgwood (29 October 1904 – 18 February 1995), known as Star Wedgwood, was a British ceramicist.

Work 
Star was introduced to pottery decoration through Alfred Powell's painting classes at the Etruria Works of the Wedgwood pottery firm in England.

She became a designer herself at the company during the early 1930s and created a number of patterns on bone china and Queen's ware for Wedgwood. Her signature was a five-pointed star and the initials CW. According to the Wedgwood Museum, "Her bone china designs tend to be bold, and made extensive use of strong colours and platinum lustre".

In 1937, Star married Frederic Maitland Wright, who later became the company secretary of Wedgwood and joint managing director with Norman Wilson. She died in Oxfordshire in 1995.

Heritage 
Born in Barlaston, Staffordshire, England, Star was the daughter of Francis Hamilton Wedgwood and his wife Katherine (née Pigott). Her father has been described as a "fifth generation Wedgwood", directly descended from the Wedgwood company founder, potter Josiah Wedgwood, thus making Star part of the Wedgwood family's sixth generation.

References

1904 births
1995 deaths
British ceramicists
20th-century British women artists
British women ceramicists
20th-century ceramists
Wedgwood pottery
People from Barlaston